The Men's Super-G in the 2023 Alpine Skiing World Cup is scheduled to consist of eight events, including the final. The season was originally planned with eight races, but two were cancelled early in the season and were not planned to be rescheduled.  However, when two races planned at Garmisch-Partenkirchen on 28-29 January 2023 were cancelled due to a lack of snow, the two previously-cancelled Super-G races were rescheduled on those dates at Cortina d'Ampezzo, restoring the original Super-G schedule plan. 

After four events, both defending champion Aleksander Aamodt Kilde and last year's runner-up Marco Odermatt had won two races each and finished second once, but Odermatt led the standings by 28 points due to the fourth result (third versus eighth).  Odermatt then won the fifth race (with Kilde second) to add to his lead, and after he won the sixth race as well, his discipline lead was up to 148 points over Kilde. Odermatt then won the next-to-last Super-G of the season in Aspen to close out Kilde, who finished third, and clinch the discipline championship for the season.

The season was interrupted by the 2023 World Ski Championships in the linked resorts of Courchevel and Méribel, France from 6–19 February 2023. Although the Alpine Skiing branch of the International Ski Federation (FIS) conducts both the World Cup and the World Championships, the World Championships are organized by nation (a maximum of four skiers is generally permitted per nation), and (since 1970) the results count only for World Championship medals, not for World Cup points. Accordingly, the results in the World Championship are highlighted in blue and shown in this table by ordinal position only in each discipline.   The men's Super-G was held in Courchevel on 9 February.

The World Cup discipline final took place on 16 March 2022 in Soldeu, Andorra. Only the top 25 in the Super-G discipline ranking and the winner of the Junior World Championship were eligible to compete in the final, except that all skiers who have scored at least 500 points in the overall classification may participate in all disciplines (but none did in Super-G). Only the top 15 finishers in each discipline scored points.

Standings

Legend

DNF = Did Not Finish 
DSQ = Disqualified

See also
 2023 Alpine Skiing World Cup – Men's summary rankings
 2023 Alpine Skiing World Cup – Men's Overall
 2023 Alpine Skiing World Cup – Men's Downhill
 2023 Alpine Skiing World Cup – Men's Giant Slalom
 2023 Alpine Skiing World Cup – Men's Slalom
 World Cup scoring system

References

External links
 Alpine Skiing at FIS website

Men's super-G
FIS Alpine Ski World Cup men's Super-G discipline titles